It is difficult to determine which programming languages are "most widely used" because the meaning of the term varies by context. One language may occupy the most programmer-hours, another may have the most lines of code, a third may utilize the most CPU time, and so on. Some languages are very popular for particular kinds of applications: for example, Python for machine learning, Java for backend server development, C in embedded applications and operating systems; JavaScript in web development and other languages for many kinds of applications.

Methods
Various counts have been proposed to indicate a language's popularity, each subject to a different bias over what is measured. These counts include the number of:
 job advertisements that mention the language 
 times the language is mentioned in web searches, as with Google Trends
 estimates of lines of code written in the language (which may underestimate languages not often found in public searches)
 references to the language found using a web search engine
 projects in the language on SourceForge and GitHub
 postings in Usenet newsgroups about the language
 commits or changed source lines for open source projects in the language on Open Hub
 courses on the language sold by programming bootcamps
 students enrolled in programming classes teaching the language around the world
 videos on the language on YouTube
 postings on Reddit or Stack Exchange about the language

Indices

Different Indices calculate a programming language's popularity based on different metrics. For example: The IEEE Spectrum publishes the rankings by taking the data points from an array of matrices including Google, GitHub, Reddit, and Twitter to calculate the overall rank for the 2021 list with keeping in the account factors like job demands, Reliability, and Current trends that sum up to say Python is the top programming language of 2021. Several indices have been published:

 The monthly TIOBE Programming Community Index has been published since 2001, showing the top 10 languages graphically, the top 20 languages with a rating and delta, and the top 50 languages by rating. The numbers are based on searching the Web with certain phrases that include language names and counting the numbers of hits returned. In 2021, the top ranking languages included: C, Python, Java, C++, and C#.
 The PYPL PopularitY of Programming Language index is an indicator based on Google Trends, reflecting the developers' searches for "<programming language> tutorial", instead of what pages are available. It shows the popularity trends since 2004, worldwide or separated for 5 countries. As of 2021, the top ranking were: Python, Java, JavaScript, and C#.
 The RedMonk Programming Language Rankings are derived from a correlation of programming traction on GitHub (usage) and Stack Overflow (discussion). As of June 2021, the top ranking were: JavaScript, Python, Java, PHP, CSS.
 Trendy Skills searches and extracts from popular advertising websites the skills and technologies that employers are seeking and classifies them in categories, one of which is Programming Languages. It displays trends for one or more skills or categories during specified time ranges. Data is also accessible via a public API, so anyone can generate their own statistics.
 Indeed 2016 survey combed through job listings, identifying mentions of programming languages.
 Stack Overflow's annual Developer Survey which polls site users. In 2021, the most popular were: JavaScript, HTML/CSS, Python, and SQL.
 IEEE Spectrum's annual ranking of top programming languages. In 2021 it used 11 metrics from 8 sources: GitHub, Google, Twitter, Stack Overflow, Reddit, Hacker News, Career Builder, and  IEEE Xplore Digital Library, according to which the top languages were Python, Java, C, C++, and JavaScript. The interactive ranking app allows adjustment of each metric's weight, and also filtering languages by "type" (Web, Mobile, Enterprise, Embedded).

References

Programming language topics
Computing comparisons
Usage share